WRJK-LD (channel 22) is a low-power television station licensed to Arlington Heights, Illinois, United States, serving the Chicago area as an affiliate of Diya TV. Owned by Major Market Broadcasting, the station maintains a transmitter atop the Willis Tower in the Chicago Loop.

Technical information

Subchannels 
The station's digital signal is multiplexed:

Spectrum auction results 
The station moved its digital signal allocation to VHF channel 11 as part of the station's participation in the FCC's spectrum auction. Transmitting power was reduced from 15 kilowatts to 400 watts (about four 100 watt light bulbs).

References

External links

 

Diya TV affiliates
Local Now affiliates
NewsNet affiliates
Comet (TV network) affiliates
Low-power television stations in the United States
RJK-LD
Television channels and stations established in 1989
1989 establishments in Illinois